The following incorporated municipalities formerly existed in the U.S. state of Florida, but have been incorporated.

A
Altoona (Lake County): disincorporated 1899
Anthony (Marion County): disincorporated 1931
Aucilla (Jefferson County): disincorporated 1915
Aurantia (Brevard County)

B
Bayview (Bay County): disincorporated 1977
Bayview (Brevard County): disincorporated 1925 (annexed by Titusville)
Belle Vista Beach (Pinellas County): disincorporated 1957 (merged with St. Petersburg Beach)
Bithlo (Orange County): disincorporated 1977
Bluff Springs (Escambia County): disincorporated 1895
Boca Ciega (Pinellas County): disincorporated 1955 (merged with Treasure Island)
Boulogne (Nassau County): disincorporated 1963
Bradley (Polk County)
Broward Gardens (Broward County): disincorporated 1955
Buena Vista (Miami-Dade County): disincorporated 1925 (annexed by Miami)

C

Cedar Grove (Bay County): disincorporated 2008
Charlotte Harbor (Charlotte County): disincorporated 1927
Charlotte-on-the-Bay (Charlotte County): disincorporated 1963
Citra (Marion County): disincorporated 1931
Cleveland (Charlotte County): disincorporated 1949
Coastal City (Nassau County): disincorporated 1951
Coconut Grove (Miami-Dade County): disincorporated 1925 (annexed by Miami)
Columbus (Suwannee County)
Coronado Beach (Volusia County): disincorporated 1946 (merged with New Smyrna Beach)
Cortez (Manatee County): disincorporated 1929
Cypress (Jackson County)

D
Daytona (Volusia County): disincorporated 1925 (merged with Daytona Beach)
DeLeon Springs (Volusia County): disincorporated 1919
Delray (Palm Beach County): disincorporated 1927 (merged with Delray Beach)
DeSoto City (Highlands County)
Don Ce-Sar Place (Pinellas County): disincorporated 1957 (merged with St. Petersburg Beach)

E
East Fort Myers (Lee County)
East Millville (Bay County): disincorporated by 1919 (merged with Millville)
East Tampa (Hillsborough County): disincorporated 1925 (annexed by Tampa)
Eau Gallie (Brevard County): disincorporated 1969 (merged with Melbourne)
Eau Gallie Beach (Brevard County): disincorporated 1943
Edgewater Gulf Beach (Bay County): disincorporated 1970 (merged with Panama City Beach)
Elfers (Pasco County): disincorporated 1933
Ellenton (Manatee County): disincorporated 1931
Englewood (Sarasota County): disincorporated 1929
Enterprise (Volusia County): disincorporated 1895
Estero (Lee County): disincorporated 1907; incorporated in 2014 as the Village of Estero

F
Fairfield (Duval County): disincorporated 1887 (annexed by Jacksonville)
Federal Point (Putnam County): disincorporated 1935
Fernandina (Nassau County): disincorporated 1951 (merged with Fernandina Beach)
Fern Crest Village (Broward County): disincorporated 1970 (later annexed by Davie)
Fivay (Pasco County)
Floral City (Citrus County): disincorporated 1911
Florence Villa (Polk County): disincorporated 1925 (annexed by Winter Haven)
Forest Park (Hillsborough County): disincorporated 1925
Fort Brooke (Hillsborough County): disincorporated 1907 (annexed by Tampa)
Fort Ogden (DeSoto County): disincorporated 1933

G
Genoa (Hamilton County): disincorporated 1901
Glendale (Walton County)
Goldsboro (Seminole County): disincorporated 1911 (annexed by Sanford)
Golfview (Palm Beach County): disincorporated 1997
Gulf Beach (Bay County): disincorporated 1955

H
Hacienda Village (Broward County): disincorporated 1984 (annexed by Davie)
Hastings (St. Johns County): disincorporated 2018
Hernando (Citrus County): disincorporated 1973
Highlands City (Polk County): disincorporated 1929
Hollywood Ridge Farms (Broward County): disincorporated 1970 (annexed by Pembroke Park)
Holt (Okaloosa County): disincorporated 1919
Hosford (Liberty County): disincorporated 1915

I

Indian Beach (Sarasota County): disincorporated 1925 (annexed by Sarasota)
Indian River City (Brevard County): disincorporated 1929
Indiantown (Martin County): disincorporated 1933
Iola (Gulf County)
Islandia (Miami-Dade County): disincorporated 2012

J
Jensen (Martin County): disincorporated 1933
Julia (Bay County): disincorporated 1955

K
Kathleen (Polk County): disincorporated 1929

L
Lakeview (Broward County): disincorporated 1969

LaVilla (Duval County): disincorporated 1887 (annexed by Jacksonville)
Lecanto (Citrus County): disincorporated 1933
Lloyd (Jefferson County): disincorporated 1913
Long Beach Resort (Bay County): disincorporated 1970 (merged with Panama City Beach)

M
Magnolia (Wakulla County)
Manatee (Manatee County): disincorporated 1944 (merged with Bradenton)
Mandarin (Duval County)
Mayport (Duval County): disincorporated 1919
Melrose (Alachua, Bradford, Clay, and Putnam Counties): disincorporated 1917
Millville (Bay County): disincorporated 1925 (annexed by Panama City)
Mims (Brevard County): disincorporated 1927
Mission City (Volusia County): disincorporated 1931
Molino (Escambia County): disincorporated 1933
Montbrook (Levy County)
Monte Vista (Lake County): disincorporated 2003
Morriston (Levy County)
Murray (Lee County)
Murray Hill (Duval County): disincorporated 1925 (annexed by Jacksonville)

N
New Augustine (St. Johns County): disincorporated 1911 (annexed by St. Augustine)
Newnansville (Alachua County)
Newport (Wakulla County)
North Key Largo Beach (Monroe County): disincorporated 2003
North Miami (Miami-Dade County): disincorporated 1913 (merged with Miami)
North Tampa (Hillsborough County): disincorporated 1887 (merged with Tampa)

O
Ochesee (Calhoun County): disincorporated 1847
Ojus (Miami-Dade County): disincorporated 1931
Ona (Hardee County)
Orlo Vista (Orange County): disincorporated 1929
Osteen (Volusia County): disincorporated 1931
Oxford (Sumter County)
Ozona (Pinellas County)

P
Painters Hill (Flagler County): disincorporated 1981
Palatka Heights (Putnam County): disincorporated 1921 (annexed by Palatka)
Palm City (Martin County): disincorporated 1937
Pass-a-Grille Beach (Pinellas County): disincorporated 1957 (merged with St. Petersburg Beach)
Pennsuco (Miami-Dade County)
Perrine (Miami-Dade County): disincorporated 1949
Pinecastle (Orange County)
Playville (Bay County): disincorporated 1955
Plumosus City (Palm Beach County): disincorporated 1959
Pompano (Broward County): disincorporated 1947 (merged with Pompano Beach)
Port Leon (Wakulla County) Briefly the county seat of Wakulla County. Abandoned after destruction by hurricane in 1843.
Port Sewall (Martin County): disincorporated 1933
Port Tampa (Hillsborough County): disincorporated 1961 (annexed by Tampa)

S
St. Andrews (Bay County): disincorporated 1925 (annexed by Panama City)
St. James City (Lee County)
St. Joseph (Gulf County)
Salerno (Martin County): disincorporated 1935
Sanford Heights (Seminole County): disincorporated 1911
San Mateo City (Putnam County): disincorporated 1933
Sarasota Heights (Sarasota County): disincorporated 1926 (merged with Sarasota)
Scottsmoor (Brevard County)
Seabreeze (Volusia County): disincorporated 1925 (merged with Daytona Beach)
Senybal (Lee County)
Seville (Volusia County)
Shady Hills (Brevard County): disincorporated 1959
Silver Bluff (Miami-Dade County): disincorporated 1925 (annexed by Miami)
Sirmons (Madison County)
South Eau Gallie (Brevard County): disincorporated 1925
South Jacksonville (Duval County): disincorporated 1932 (annexed by Jacksonville)
South Madeira Beach (Pinellas County): disincorporated 1951 (merged with Madeira Beach)
Sulphur Springs Park (Hillsborough County): disincorporated 1947 (annexed by Tampa)
Sumterville (Sumter County)
Sunset Beach (Pinellas County): disincorporated 1955 (merged with Treasure Island)
Sunshine Beach (Pinellas County): disincorporated 1955 (merged with Treasure Island)

T
Taft (Orange County): disincorporated 1933
Trilby (Pasco County): disincorporated 1909; reincorporated from 1913 to 1935
Tyler (Gilchrist County)

U
University Park (Palm Beach County): disincorporated 1971 (annexed by Boca Raton)

V
Vamo (Sarasota County): disincorporated 1927
Verna (Manatee and Sarasota Counties): disincorporated 1927

W
Wabasso (Indian River County): disincorporated 1935
Wade (Alachua County)
Ward Ridge (Gulf County): disincorporated 1987 (annexed by Port St. Joe)
Wellborn (Suwannee County): disincorporated 1931
West Hollywood (Broward County): disincorporated 1963 (annexed by Hollywood)
West Panama City Beach (Bay County): disincorporated 1970 (merged with Panama City Beach)
West Tampa (Hillsborough County): disincorporated 1925 (annexed by Tampa)
Whispering Hills Golf Estates (Brevard County): disincorporated 1963 (annexed by Titusville)
Wimauma (Hillsborough County)

Y
Yalaha (Lake County): disincorporated 1937

See also
List of municipalities in Florida

References
Joint Legislative Management Committee, Index to Special and Local Laws 1845-1970
Division of Law Revision and Information, Index to Laws of Florida Special and Local Laws 1971 to 2013

 
 former
 former
 former
 former
 former
Former municipalities